Sympistis is a genus of moths of the family Noctuidae. The genus was erected by Jacob Hübner in 1823.

Species

References

 Troubridge, J. T. (2008). "A generic realignment of the Oncocnemidini sensu Hodges (1983) (Lepidoptera: Noctuidae: Oncocnemidinae), with description of a new genus and 50 new species". Zootaxa. 1903: 1-95.